Turkey participated in all editions of the Mediterranean Games since its establishment in 1951. As of 2018, Turkish athletes have won a total of 860 medals, divided into 339 golds, 242 silvers and 279 bronzes. Turkey ranks at third place following Italy and France.

Medal table history

References

https://www.iwf.net/results/athletes/?athlete=taylan-nurcan-1983-10-29&id=91

External links